This article lists the various Zhuang customs and culture of Wenshan Zhuang and Miao Autonomous Prefecture, Yunnan, China (Johnson & Wang 2008).

Literature

The Zhuang peoples of Yunnan and Guangxi have a rich written and unwritten literature (Johnson & Wang 2008).

Classic texts of the Zhuang religion Mo

bone carvings as instruments for fortune-telling
Swqmo: records of Zhuang history, ethnic relations, astronomy, farming technology, literary arts, religious beliefs, customs and traditions, and so on.
Swqdugzaeq: ("Chicken Divination Scriptures")
Swqyaq: traditional medicine guides
Swqlwnz: folk songbooks
Paeng'zong: banners hung during sacrifice ceremonies for funerals
Paengban: long banners hung during sacrifice ceremonies to repel evil
Paengsaeh: banners hung during animal sacrifices for religious ceremonies

Folk literature

Zhuang folk literature often takes the form of songs. There are various folk tales, myths, legends, and historical poems and chants.

"The creation of the world hymn"
"The cutting down the banana tree song" ("Kau Tam Gvoa")
"The song of the origin of bronze" ("Gvau Dong")
"The rice paddy-planting song"
"The house-raising song"
"Village visitation songs"
"Wine banquet songs"
"The national partition song"
"Banlong and Banli"
Poems of the Poya Songbook
"The escape from marriage song"
"Yiluo and Diling"
"Buloakdvo"
"Bronze drum legends"
"Tea origin songs"
"The Legend of Wenlong"

Folk arts
Zhuang folk arts include (Johnson & Wang 2008):

Music
Masa classical music: classical orchestras of Masa Village, Maguan County, Yunnan
Zhuang ceremonial music
Bawu: a type of Zhuang folk music dating back to ancient times
Mubala: ancient Zhuang wind instrument
Huqin: stringed instrument made from a water buffalo horn or horse bone; may be two-stringed or four-stringed
Svaeu'na toasting: playing a suona while balancing a cup of wine to serve to guests

Dances
bronze drum dance
straw man dance
water buffalo dance (longh yah vaiz)
paper horse dance
hand towel dance
sun (tang'vaenz) dance

Handicrafts
Traditional Zhuang folk handicrafts includes the following (Johnson & Wang 2008).

bird totem hats
elephant trunk shoes reflecting Zhuang elephant worship
totem back carriers, consisting of fish, bird, and abstract symbolic designs
cloth monkey medicine bags
embroidered balls
spinning tops
: teeter-totter; the ai nyaeuh gvaen is a more complex variant
wood prints
paper
traditional waterwheels
traditional brocades and weavings
silver jewelry
straw mats
bamboo basket weaving
rattan
Paeng'vae: a type of linen made of grass leaves and hemp fibers, made by weaving the two 90 degrees with each other

Folk customs
The Zhuang of Wenshan have a colorful variety of folk customs (Johnson & Wang 2008).

sacrificing to the field deity
mountain sacrifices
worshipping Zoa'nongz, the god of the ndoang (forest)
sacrifices to Zoachu, the sun deity and original ancestor spirits now living in trees of ancient forests
sacrifices to the mother tree or mih maix (among the Dai or Tu of Wenshan)
Third Lunar Month Festival; young men and women sing call-and-response songs to each other
Longdvaen festival: theatric performances in Guichao Township, Funing County
Opening the seedlings' door ceremony: a healthy, beautiful girl is chosen to plant the first seedling
Ceremony for repelling insects: insects are loaded onto paper boats, which are floated away in the water while drums and gongs are beaten
Sacrifices to Nong Zhigao in the 6th and 7th lunar months; purple-dyed glutinous rice is offered, and sometimes cattle
Buffalo King Festival - celebrated in Niutouzhai Village, Wenshan County, where there is a Buffalo King Temple. The Zhuang have long worshipped the water buffalo.
offerings to the sun: In Shangguo Village, Xichou County, Zhuang women bathe in the river, put on their traditional clothing and headdresses, and then make offerings to the sun with yellow glutinous rice, which they carry up Sun Mountain.
Firstfruits Festival
Sky Sacrifices: practiced in Bahao (Pya'Kau), Guangnan County, which a wooden hall on Bozhe Mountain is dedicated for
hvaeng ting Svaeu (townhall shrine) sacrifices: in Guima Village, Guangnan County
sweeping the village to chase away evil
festival of the ancestor sacrifice of the 7th lunar month
the Duanwu medicine festival
sacrifice to the song immortal: shrine in Ake Village, Guangnan County
reception of the Princess Huanggu
bullfighting festival
sacrifices to bronze drums
sacrifices to Nong Zhigao
year end festival: practiced among the Bu Dai Zhuang.
Zhuang children's festival; dates chosen by each individual village

Traditional medicine
Zang'yaq: Zhuang folk medicine
Qingcyaeu: the Sanqi (Panax notoginseng), which has the Chinese nicknames "not to be exchanged for gold" and "the southern divine herb"
Laeujyaq: medicinal liquor

See also
Hmong customs and culture
Zhuang people
Zhuang customs and culture
Dong people
Sui people

References

Johnson, Eric and Wang Mingfu. 2008. "Zhuang cultural and linguistic heritage". SIL International and the Nationalities Publishing House of Yunnan.

Zhuang people